The Lancia Eta (30/50 HP) is a car which was produced between 1911-1914 by Lancia. The Eta was smaller than the Epsilon built at the same time, more like the earlier Delta. From 1913 the Eta could be delivered with electrical lights. The car has a straight-four engine with a capacity of 4084 cc which produced around 60 hp at 1800 rpm.

References
Lancia by Michael Frostick, 1976. 

Eta-30 50HP
Cars introduced in 1911
Brass Era vehicles